The 1986 Campionati Internazionali di Sicilia was a men's tennis tournament played on outdoor clay courts in Palermo, Italy that was part of the 1986 Nabisco Grand Prix. It was the eighth edition of the tournament and took place from 29 September until 5 October 1986. First-seeded Ulf Stenlund won the singles title.

Finals

Singles
 Ulf Stenlund defeated  Pablo Arraya 6–2, 6–3
 It was Stenlund's only singles title of his career.

Doubles
 Paolo Canè /  Simone Colombo defeated  Claudio Mezzadri /  Gianni Ocleppo 7–5, 6–3

References

External links
 ITF tournament edition details

Campionati Internazionali di Sicilia
Campionati Internazionali di Sicilia
Campionati Internazionali di Sicilia